Love Songs is a compilation album of love songs by singer Johnny Gill, which includes material from Johnny Gill (1990), Provocative (1993), Let's Get The Mood Right (1996), as well as New Edition's Heartbreak (1988), and the soundtracks for New Jack City (1991) and Mo' Money (1992).

Track listing
"My, My, My"
"Lady Dujour"
"Let's Spend the Night"
"Mastersuite"
"I Got You"
"Quiet Time to Play"
"Someone to Love"
"Let's Get the Mood Right"
"It's Your Body" (Mario Winans Remix) (Feat. Roger Troutman)
"Can You Stand the Rain"
"I'm Still Waiting"
"Let's Just Run Away"

Album credits
Johnny Gill – Producer, Vocal Arrangement, Liner Notes
Nathan Morris – Producer
Wanya Morris – Producer
Randy Ran – Producer
Babyface – Producer
Daryl Simmons – Producer
Shawn Stockman – Producer
Harry Weinger – Compilation Producer
Lance Alexander – Producer, Vocal Arrangement, Rhythm Arrangements
Ellen Fitton – Digital Remastering
Vartan – Art Direction
Prof. T. – Producer, Rhythm Arrangements, Vocal Arrangement
Dana Smart – Compilation Producer
Albert Watson – Photography
Pamela Springsteen – Photography
Rebecca Meek – Design
Eddie Wolfl – Photography
Ryan Null – Photo Research
Shannon Steckloff – Production Coordination
Kevin Anders – Producer
R. Kelly – Arranger, Producer
Kayo – Producer
Jimmy Jam – Producer, Vocal Arrangement
Terry Lewis – Producer, Vocal Arrangement
Boyz II Men – Vocals (Background)
Kenny G – Saxophone, Soloist, Guest Appearance

References

Johnny Gill albums
2005 greatest hits albums
Motown compilation albums